The Field hockey competition at the 2006 Central American and Caribbean Games was held in Santo Domingo, Dominican Republic. The tournament was scheduled to be held from 15–30 July 2006.

Medal summary

Medalists

Medal table

Men's tournament

Preliminary round

Pool A

Pool B

Fifth to eighth place classification

Medal round

Final standings

Women's tournament

Preliminary round

Pool A

Pool B

Fifth to eighth place classification

Medal round

Final standings

References

 

2006 Central American and Caribbean Games
2006
2006 Central American and Caribbean Games
Central American and Caribbean Games